The six Northwest Kainji languages, also known as the Lela languages or the Duka languages, are spoken near Kainji Lake on the Niger River in Nigeria. They are distinguishable from other Kainji languages by the reduction of their noun-class prefixes to single consonants.

Classification

Blench (2018)
Northwest Kainji classification by Blench (2018):

? Damakawa
(node)
cLela
Hun-Saare
Ma'in, Wurə-Gwamhyə-Mba

The position of Damakawa is uncertain.

Blench (2010)
In Blench (2010), Lela (C'lela and Ribah) is divergent from the other languages, though poorly attested Damakawa has similarities.

Lela (C'lela), ? Damakawa
(node)
Gwamhi-Wuri
ut-Ma'in (Fakai), Hun-Saare (Duka)

References

 
Kainji languages